The 2016–17 Alcorn State Braves basketball team represented Alcorn State University during the 2016–17 NCAA Division I men's basketball season. The Braves, led by second year head coach Montez Robinson, played their home games at the Davey Whitney Complex in Lorman, Mississippi as members of the Southwestern Athletic Conference. They finished the season 18–14, 13–5 in SWAC play to finish in second place.

The Braves were ineligible for NCAA postseason play due to APR violations for the second straight year. However, they were allowed to participate in the SWAC tournament where they defeated Mississippi Valley State and Southern to advance to the championship game where they lost to Texas Southern.

Previous season
The Braves finished the 2015–16 season 15–15, 13–5 in SWAC play to finish in second place. They lost to Mississippi Valley State in the quarterfinals of the SWAC tournament. The Braves were ineligible for NCAA postseason play due to APR violations.

Roster

Schedule and results

|-
!colspan=9 style=| Non-conference regular season

|-
!colspan=9 style=| SWAC regular season

|-
!colspan=9 style=| SWAC tournament

References

Alcorn State Braves basketball seasons
Alcorn State